Herbert William Richmond (born on the 17 July 1863 in Tottenham, England) was a mathematician who studied the Cremona–Richmond configuration. One of his most popular works is an exact construction of the regular heptadecagon in 1893 (which was calculated before by Carl Friedrich Gauss).

Herbert was elected as a Fellow of the Royal Society in 1911. On the 22 April 1948, Herbert died in Cambridge, England.

The Richmond surface is named after him.

References

English mathematicians
1863 births
1948 deaths
People from Tottenham